Sanicula uralensis is a species of flowering plant in the black snakeroot genus Sanicula, family Apiaceae. Native to western Siberia, it prefers to live in wetter areas in the undergrowth of both deciduous and coniferous mountain forests.

References

uralensis
Endemic flora of Russia
Flora of West Siberia
Plants described in 2002